The 1977 King Cup was the 19th season of the knockout competition since its establishment in 1956. Al-Nassr were the defending champions; however, they were eliminated in the semi-finals by Al-Hilal. The final saw Al-Ahli beat Al-Hilal 3–1, with Al-Ahli scoring all three goals in the final fifteen minutes. Al-Ahli won their seventh title and first since 1973.

Bracket

Source: Al-Jazirah

Round of 32
The matches of the Round of 32 were held on 5 and 6 May 1977.

Round of 16
The Round of 16 matches were held on 9 and 10 May 1977.

Quarter-finals
The Quarter-final matches were held on 12 and 13 May 1977.

Semi-finals
The four winners of the quarter-finals progressed to the semi-finals. The semi-finals were played on 16 May 1977. All times are local, AST (UTC+3).

Final
The final was played between Al-Ahli and Al-Hilal in the Youth Welfare Stadium in Riyadh. This was Al-Ahli's 9th final. Previously Al-Ahli won six times in 1962, 1965, 1969, 1970, 1971, and 1973 and lost in 1974 and 1976. This was Al-Hilal's 5th final. Previously Al-Hilal won twice in 1961 and 1964 and lost in 1963 and 1968. This was the first meeting between these two sides in the final.

References

1977
Saudi Arabia
Cup